Peabody Energy coal mining operations in the Black Mesa plateau of the Four Corners region in the western United States began in the 1960s and ended in 2019. The plateau overlaps the reservations of the Navajo and Hopi Tribes.

Controversy arose from an unusually generous mineral lease agreement between the Tribes and Peabody Energy, the coal company's use and degradation of a potable source of water to transport coal via a pipeline from the mine to a power plant hundreds of miles away, and the public health and environmental impacts of strip mining on tribal lands.

Controversy

In 1964, Peabody Energy (then Peabody Western Coal), a publicly traded energy company based in the Midwestern United States, signed a contract with the Navajo Tribe and two years later with the Hopi Tribe, allowing the company mineral rights and use of an aquifer. The contract was negotiated by prominent natural resources attorney John Sterling Boyden, who claimed to be representing the Hopi Tribe while actually on the payroll of Peabody. It offered unusually advantageous terms for Peabody and was approved despite widespread opposition.
The contract is also controversial because of misrepresentations made to the Hopi and Navajo tribes.

Peabody Energy developed two coal strip mines on the Black Mesa reservation: the Black Mesa Mine and the Kayenta Mine.

Peabody Energy pumped water from the underground Navajo Aquifer for washing coal, and, until 2005, in a slurry pipeline operation to transport extracted coal to the Mohave Generating Station in Laughlin, Nevada. With the pipeline operating, Peabody pumped, on average, 3 million gallons of water from the Navajo Aquifer every day. The aquifer is the main source of potable groundwater for the Navajo and Hopi tribes, who use the water for farming and livestock maintenance as well as drinking and other domestic uses. The tribes alleged that the pumping of water by Peabody Energy caused a severe decline in potable water and the number of springs. Both tribes, situated in an arid semi-desert, attach religious significance to water, considering it sacred, and have cultural, religious, and practical objections to over-use of water.

Peabody's Black Mesa Mine used the slurry to pump its coal through pipes  to where the coal could be filtered and used in the Mohave Generating Station in Laughlin, Nevada (which was shut down in 2005). The generating station produced energy for Arizona and southern California and Nevada. This was the only coal slurry operation in the country and only plant that used groundwater for transport.

Coal from the Kayenta mine was moved via conveyor belt to a silo from where it was loaded and shipped by train to the Navajo Generating Station coal plant.

The Black Mesa Mine's last day of operation was December 31, 2005. The Office of Surface Mining approved Peabody's permit request to continue operations at the mine on December 22, 2008. However, in January 2010, an administrative law judge, on appeal of that approval, decided that the Final EIS did not satisfy the National Environmental Policy Act because it did not take into account changed conditions, and vacated the approval.

Operations at the Kayenta Mine were ceased in 2019.

See also
 Energy law#United States
 Broken Rainbow

References

Further reading

External links
Black Mesa Trust organization
Black Mesa Indigenous Support
"Peabody Energy," SourceWatch
  Article and bibliography about Peabody water abstraction, published by a sacred land campaign group.
"Drawdown: An Update on Groundwater Mining on Black Mesa," a 2000 report (updated in 2006) by the Natural Resources Defense Council on the effects on the Hopi's and Navajo's drinking water sources

Mining in Arizona
Coal mining in the United States
Hopi Reservation
Navajo Nation
Environmental impact of the coal industry
Environment of Arizona
Environmental controversies
Navajo history
Water and politics
Water pollution in the United States
Peabody Energy
Native American-related controversies